Henry Talbot was an Argentine rugby union footballer, who played in the Club Atlético del Rosario, and in the Argentina national rugby union team.

Career 
Talbot was born in Rosario, Argentina, member of a family of British ancestry. He started his career in rugby union playing as wing for the Club Atlético del Rosario. Talbot was the Captain of the Rosario team, and had won two consecutive titles in 1905 and 1906.

In 1910, Talbot was part of the first Argentina national team, captained by Oswald Gebbie. On June 12, 1910, he made his debut for Argentina against Great Britain.

Titles

References

External links 

Argentina international rugby union players
Argentine rugby union players
Rugby union players from Buenos Aires
Argentine people of Welsh descent
Rugby union wings
Río de la Plata